Richard Reid Rogers (December 4, 1867 – November 10, 1949) was a prominent United States lawyer, specializing in transit law.

Early life
He was born on December 4, 1867 in Bourbon County, Kentucky to Benjamin F. Rogers and Elizabeth H. (née Jameson) Rogers.  After his father's unexpected death, his mother remarried to Judge Richard Reid. His maternal grandfather was U.S. Representative from Missouri, John Jameson.

Rogers graduated in 1886 from Princeton University before studying law at the University of Virginia.

Career
He began his career in New York City with Guthrie, Cravath, & Henderson, before serving as the general counsel to both the Isthmian Canal Commission and later the Panama Railroad Company. He subsequently was counsel to the Metropolitan Street Railway and several of its successor companies.

On June 20, 1906, Rogers was appointed as general counsel to the Isthmian Canal Commission, to replace outgoing Governor Charles Edward Magoon. In November of that year, President Theodore Roosevelt temporarily abolished the office of Governor of the Panama Canal Zone, to give greater autonomy to the chief engineer of the canal project. This order placed all of the duties of the Governor on the general counsel, in effect making Rogers the Governor in all but title (though he was not required to govern from the Canal Zone itself and he remained in Washington, D.C.).

Personal life
On June 25, 1891, Rogers was married to Sarah Eunice Tomlin (1867–1945) in Madison, Tennessee. They were the parents of one daughter:

 Elizabeth Reid Rogers (1893–1957), who married into the German nobility and the House of Hesse, by marrying Prince Christian of Hesse-Philippsthal-Barchfeld, a son of Prince William, in 1915 and being titled Baroness von Barchfeld.

He died on November 10, 1949 at the University Club in New York City. He was buried at the Machpelah Cemetery in Mount Sterling, Kentucky.

Descendants
Through his daughter Elizabeth, he was a grandfather of four: Elisabeth Auguste (1915–2003), Richard Christian (1917–1985), Waldemar (1919–2002) and Marie Louise Olga (1921–1999), who were permitted to title themselves Prinz/Prinzessin von Hessen (Prince/Princess of Hesse).

References

External links

1868 births
1949 deaths
Princeton University alumni
University of Virginia School of Law alumni
Rogers